Fürstenau may refer to:

Fürstenau, Lower Saxony, a city in Lower Saxony, Germany
Fürstenau (Samtgemeinde), a municipality in the district of Osnabrück, in Lower Saxony, Germany 
Fürstenau (Altenberg) a quarter (Ortsteil) in Altenberg, Saxony
Fürstenau Castle, a historical castle in Michelstadt, Germany
Fürstenau, Switzerland

Former name for the following Polish places

Kmiecin, now within Nowy Dwór Gdański County (formerly Fürstenau, Landkreis Elbing, Pomerania)
Książęca Wieś, now within Trzebnica County (formerly Fürstenau, Landkreis Militsch, Lower Silesia Province (Prussia))

Composers

 Anton Bernhard Fürstenau (born 20 October 1792, Münster, Germany; died 18 November 1852, Dresden, Germany)
 Kaspar Fürstenau (born 26 February 1772; died 11 May 1819)
 Moritz Fürstenau (born 26 June 1824; died 27 March 1889)